Eastern Kadazan, also known as Labuk Kadazan, Kinabatangan Kadazan, or Sungai, is an Austronesian language primarily spoken in Sabah, Malaysia.

References

Further reading
 

Dusunic languages
Languages of Malaysia